Count Jerzy Józef Henryk Potocki (29 January 1889 – 10 September 1961) was a Polish nobleman, captain of the cavalry and diplomat. (Note that the Almanach błękitny gives his name as Jerzy Antoni Potocki)

Early life
His parents were Roman Potocki, Third Ordynat of Łańcut, and Elżbieta Matylda Radziwiłł. His elder brother was Count Alfred Antoni Potocki.

His paternal grandparents were Count Alfred Józef Potocki, the Minister-President of Austria, and Princess Maria Klementyna Sanguszko. He was also a great-great-grandson of Jan Potocki. His maternal grandparents were Prince Antoni Wilhelm Radziwiłł and Marie de Castellane (the daughter of French aristocrats Henri de Castellane and Pauline de Talleyrand-Périgord). His paternal uncle, Count Józef Mikołaj Potocki, married his maternal aunt, Princess Helena Augusta Radziwiłł.

Career
On 8 January 1919 he joined the Polish Army after the dissolution of the Austro-Hungarian Empire and Army, was assigned to the General Staff and appointed military attaché in Budapest.

Since 1933 in the diplomatic service, he was appointed ambassador to Italy but refused to take the commission in protest against the Four-Power Pact. From 1933 to 1936 he was ambassador in Ankara and from 1936 to 1940 in Washington.

Personal life
On 28 June 1931, he married Peruvian born Susanita Yturregui (b. 1899) in Paris. Together, they were the parents of:

 Count Stanisław Potocki (b. 1932)

Count Potocki died on 10 September 1961 in Geneva, Switzerland.

References

1889 births
1961 deaths
Nobility from Vienna
Jerzy Antoni Potocki
Counts of Poland
Senators of the Second Polish Republic (1930–1935)
Ambassadors of Poland to the United States
Ambassadors of Poland to Turkey
Polish Army officers
Polish military attachés
Diplomats from Vienna